Nicolás Omar Freire (born 18 February 1994) is an Argentine professional footballer who plays as a centre-back for Liga MX club UNAM.

Career
Freire is a youth exponent from CAI and Argentinos Juniors. He joined the Argentinos first-team in July 2012, making his debut during the 2012–2013 season.

In 2017, Freire left Argentinos to join Uruguayan Segunda División side Torque. He was immediately loaned out to PEC Zwolle of the Eredivisie.

On 26 June 2018 Freire was loaned to Palmeiras for a one-year deal.

Honours

Club
Palmeiras
Campeonato Brasileiro Série A: 2018

L.D.U. Quito
Copa Ecuador: 2019

References

1994 births
Living people
Association football defenders
Argentine footballers
Argentine expatriate footballers
Argentine expatriate sportspeople in Uruguay
Argentine expatriate sportspeople in the Netherlands
Expatriate footballers in Uruguay
Expatriate footballers in the Netherlands
Expatriate footballers in Ecuador
Expatriate footballers in Mexico
Argentine Primera División players
Primera Nacional players
Uruguayan Segunda División players
Eredivisie players
Ecuadorian Serie A players
Liga MX players
Argentinos Juniors footballers
Montevideo City Torque players
PEC Zwolle players
Sociedade Esportiva Palmeiras players
L.D.U. Quito footballers
Club Universidad Nacional footballers
Sportspeople from Corrientes Province